Limonius canus, the Pacific coast wireworm, is a species of click beetle in the family Elateridae. It is found in North America.

References

Further reading

 

Elateridae
Articles created by Qbugbot